John Lyndon Jaffray (born 17 April 1950) is a former New Zealand rugby union player. A first or second five-eighth, Jaffray represented Otago and South Canterbury at a provincial level, and was a member of the New Zealand national side, the All Blacks, between 1972 and 1979. He played 23 matches for the All Blacks including seven internationals.

References

1950 births
Living people
Rugby union players from Dunedin
People educated at Kaikorai Valley College
New Zealand rugby union players
New Zealand international rugby union players
Otago rugby union players
Rugby union fly-halves
Rugby union centres
South Canterbury rugby union players